BARS or Combat Army Reserve of the Country is a Russian military reserve force implemented since 2021. BARS troops have been used in the 2022 Russian invasion of Ukraine.

Units
BARS-1, Kuban Cossacks
BARS-9, Commander Rustam Ziganshin died in September 2021.
BARS-13, 'Russian Legion'  Commander Sergei Fomchenkov.
BARS-16, 'Kuban', Kuban Cossacks

References

Army units and formations of Russia
Reserve forces